Centre Natació Mataró, also known  is a Catalan sports club from Mataró, Barcelona created in 1932. It is active in swimming, water polo, table tennis and triathlon. The men's and women's water polo teams play in the División de Honor Masculina and the División de Honor Femenina respectively. The male team played LEN competitions for the first time in the 2003–04 LEN Trophy, while the female team made its debut in the 2009–10 LEN Trophy. They are also known respectively as Mataró Quadis and Mataró El Tot for sponsorship reasons. The women's table tennis section has also represented Spain in the ETTU Cup.

Titles
Women Water Polo:
LEN Trophy: 1
2016
Copa de la Reina: 2
2016, 2022
Spanish Supercup: 3
2019, 2021, 2022

Squads

Water polo
 Men's team
 Mario Lloret, Ramiro Veich, Marc Vera, Marc Corbalán, Óscar Aguilar, Eduard Minguez, Max Casabella, Pol Daura, Alex Codina, Víctor Fernández, Gustavo Guimarães, Germán Yáñez, Marc Pannon, Pau Campos.

 Women's team
 Elena Sánchez, Queralt Bertran, Helena Lloret, Anna Gual, D. Jackovich, Vivian Sevenich, Clara Cambray, Chris Nogué, Marta Bach, Maria Bernabé, Anni Espar, Alejandra Aznar, Blanca Colominas, Carla Martín, Alba Bonamusa, Isabel Piralkova, Ana Aparicio.

Swimming
 Men's team
 Pol Cantó, Chus Collado, Dani García, David Roncero, Josua Sumios, Andreu Valls.
 Women's team
 Mireia Biel, Berta Cantó, Carla Chaves, Irene Illa, Aina Jiménez, Sara Martínez, Adriana Roca, Natàlia Torné, Aina Triola, Núria Vivas.

Table tennis
 Men's table tennis
 Pau Nolis, Xavier Peral, Toni Prados, Yordi Jason Ramos.
 Women's table tennis
 Liu Chang, Galia Dvorak, Natalya Prosvirnina.

References

External links
Official website

Water polo clubs in Catalonia
Sports clubs established in 1932
1932 establishments in Spain
Mataró